Strilkove is a Ukrainian village in Henichesk raion of Kherson oblast. It belongs to Henichesk urban hromada, one of the hromadas of Ukraine. In 2001 its population was 1,372, and was predominantly ethnic Russian. 

The village became a focal point in the 2014 Russian military intervention in Ukraine. The village is located on the Arabat Spit and is geographically part of Crimea, however it falls under the administration of Kherson Oblast. Moreover, the village also housed a gas transit center strategically important for the peninsula. Russian troops occupied parts of the village, this was the first time Russian troops moved into the Kherson Oblast. In December 2014 the Ukrainian Border Guards Service stated Russian troops began a withdrawal from Kherson Oblast ending the 9 month standoff, however although Russian troops left all other positions in Kherson they continued to occupy the gas distribution station located outside the village. Strilkove represented one of the few parts of Crimea that was still under direct Ukrainian control, until it was reoccupied by Russian forces in the 2022 Russian invasion of Ukraine.

Geography
The village lies on the northern portion of Crimean peninsula's Arabat Spit, though neither Strilkove nor the neighboring village of Shchaslyvtseve are claimed as part of the Crimean Autonomous Republic. It is located 8 kilometres to the north of the border of the Crimean Republic, between the Azov Sea to the east, and Lake Sivash in the west; and is 32 km south from the town of Henichesk.

History
Strilkove was founded in 1835 and, until 1945, was named Çoqraq or Chokrak (Чокрак).

Deportation of 1944 
In 1944 unlike other Crimean Tatars inhabitants of Çoqraq were not deported to Middle Asia. There is a popular thought that the village was forgotten. In June 1945 the whole village population (including people of Slav origin) were put on a barge which was later sunk in Azov sea. "However, in June 1945, the authorities drew attention to this 'flaw' (and Stalin had already been informed about the complete 'purification' of the peninsula), so the villagers (mostly Crimean Tatars, but also some Ukrainians) were loaded onto a barge and taken to the Sea of Azov, where in the middle of the sea the barge was flooded along with all the people... 413 soldiers and commanders received combat orders and medals for the deportation of Crimean Tatars."

Crimea crisis and War in Donbas
During the Russian occupation of Crimea, on 15 March 2014 at about 13:30, some Russian Airborne Troops (40 riflemen) advanced on the village.

The village is located on the Arabat Spit and is geographically a part of Crimea, however administratively it is in the Kherson Oblast. Russian paratroopers landed in the village during the 2014 Crimea Crisis, marking the first time Russian forces advanced into mainland Ukraine as prior to this Russian troops operated only in the Autonomous Republic of Crimea. The soldiers stated that they missed their landing zone and landed in the village by accident and proceeded to retreat to the gas distribution terminal located near the village. Ukraine for the first time during the conflict placed its air forces on alert and air lifted its own unit of paratroopers to the area. Russian forces retreated from the center of the village but maintained the occupation of the gas distribution center, Russian forces stated that the gas distribution center may be vulnerable to a terrorist attack and needed to be secured.

As of October 2014 Ukrainian border guards and a volunteer territorial defense battalion were stationed in the village. Russian forces maintained a company of 150 troops which are also supported by a gunboat. The area did not experience any fighting since the Russian takeover of the offshore gas platforms near the village. However, border guards were instructed to not allow people whose Russian passport have been issued in Crimea to pass, as well as to inspect vehicles for possible Russian contraband. The small force deployed to the village was also designated to slow a possible advance of Russian troops into Kherson, while a large contingent of Ukrainian forces was stationed at Novooleksiivka and Henichesk, about 20 miles north along the Arabat Spit. On 9 December 2014 Ukraine's border guards reported that Russian troops began withdrawing from southern Kherson Oblast, ending the 9-month-long occupation. Despite the withdrawal Russian troops still occupied the gas distribution center outside the village. The Arabat Spit and the Syvash areas of Crimea were the remaining territories of the peninsula that were under direct Ukrainian control until the 2022 Russian invasion of Ukraine.

Gallery

See also
Chongar

References

External links

Villages in Henichesk Raion
Spa towns in Ukraine